The Unborn may refer to: 
Unborn, any stage of prenatal development from fertilization to birth
Wu Sheng Lao Mu, the creator of the universe according to the Way of Former Heaven doctrine
 Anutpada, the Buddhist doctrine of the absence of an origin

In entertainment 
The Unborn, the UK title for Tomorrow's Children, a 1934 American film directed by Crane Wilbur
The Unborn (1991 film), starring Brooke Adams
The Unborn (2003 film), written and directed by Bhandit Thongdee
The Unborn (2009 film), written and directed by David S. Goyer
The Unborn (album), by Mors Principium Est
Unborn (album), by Six Feet Under
Unborn, a plot-relevant species from the Bloody Roar video game series

See also 
Unborn child (disambiguation)